Zandra Reppe (born 23 December 1973) is a Swedish Paralympic archer and curler.

She has competed in the 2008 Summer Paralympics, 2012 Summer Paralympics and 2016 Summer Paralympics in Compound archery and the 2014 Winter Paralympics and 2018 Winter Paralympics in wheelchair curling.

References

External links

Paralympic archers of Sweden
Paralympic wheelchair curlers of Sweden
Archers at the 2008 Summer Paralympics
Archers at the 2012 Summer Paralympics
Archers at the 2016 Summer Paralympics
Wheelchair curlers at the 2014 Winter Paralympics
Wheelchair curlers at the 2018 Winter Paralympics
2008 Summer Paralympians of Sweden
2012 Summer Paralympians of Sweden
2016 Summer Paralympians of Sweden
2014 Winter Paralympians of Sweden
2018 Winter Paralympians of Sweden
Living people
Swedish female archers
Swedish female curlers
Swedish wheelchair curlers
1973 births
21st-century Swedish women